Brown v. Texas, 443 U.S. 47 (1979), was a United States Supreme Court case in which the Court determined that the defendant's arrest in El Paso, Texas, for a refusal to identify himself, after being seen and questioned in a high crime area, was not based on a reasonable suspicion of wrongdoing and thus violated the Fourth Amendment. It is an important case for Stop and Identify statutes in the United States.

The decision was written by Chief Justice Warren Burger and unanimously supported by the other justices. His summary of the factual elements of the case includes the following:

Two police officers, while cruising near noon in a patrol car, observed appellant and another man walking away from one another in an alley in an area with a high incidence of drug traffic. They stopped and asked appellant to identify himself and explain what he was doing. One officer testified that he stopped appellant because the situation "looked suspicious and we had never seen that subject in that area before." The officers did not claim to suspect appellant of any specific misconduct, nor did they have any reason to believe that he was armed. When appellant refused to identify himself, he was arrested for violation of a Texas statute which makes it a criminal act for a person to refuse to give his name and address to an officer "who has lawfully stopped him and requested the information."

The finding held that:

The application of the Texas statute to detain appellant and require him to identify himself violated the Fourth Amendment because the officers lacked any reasonable suspicion to believe that appellant was engaged or had engaged in criminal conduct. Detaining appellant to require him to identify himself constituted a seizure of his person subject to the requirement of the Fourth Amendment that the seizure be "reasonable."

While the application of the relevant Texas law was held unconstitutional in the case, the constitutional status of the law itself was not addressed.

The statute in question, Tex. Penal Code § 38.02(a) has since been revised to only make it a crime to refuse to identify oneself after being lawfully arrested.

See also
 Terry v. Ohio, 1968
 Hiibel v. Sixth Judicial District Court of Nevada, 2004

References

External links
 

United States Supreme Court cases of the Burger Court
United States Supreme Court cases
1979 in United States case law
1979 in Texas
United States Fourth Amendment case law